Con Todo Mi Amor..!! is the sixth (6th) studio album by Puerto Rican singer Yolandita Monge and her last under Teca Records while relocated in México. It was released in 1974 after Yo Soy and contains the radio hits Vete de Aquí and Porque Diste Vuelta A La Cara.

The album was re-issued in cassette format on 1987 and digitally remastered in CD format in 1992 by the label Disco Hit.  It is available as a digital download at iTunes and Amazon, being her only studio album from her very early years to be available in digital platforms.

Track listing

Credits and personnel
Vocals: Yolandita Monge
Producers: Raúl Fortunato, Roberto Montiel, Larry Goday, Tito Iglesias
Musical Direction and Arrangements: Roberto Montiel, Tito Iglesias, Larry Godoy, Raul Fortunato
Album Design: Visual Communications, NYC
Art Direction: Izzy Sanabria, Chico Alvarez.

Notes
Track listing and credits from album cover.
Re-released in Cassette Format on 1987 by Patty (Patty 1097).
Re-released in CD Format by Disco Hit on 1992 (DHCD9124) (Digitally processed by DRS in July 1992). 
Re-released digitally by Disco Hit Productions on November 1, 2011.

References

Yolandita Monge albums
1974 albums